Milford station may refer to:

Railway stations
 Milford station (Connecticut), on the New Haven Line/Shore Line East in Milford, Connecticut, United States 
 Milford station (Delaware), a disused station in Milford, Delaware, United States
 Milford Railway Station, Surrey on the Portsmouth Direct Line, United Kingdom
 Milford railway station (Northern Ireland), on the Castleblayney, Keady and Armagh Railway in Northern Ireland
 Milford railway station (Salisbury), United Kingdom, opened by the London and South Western Railway in 1847
 Milford Haven railway station, also known as Milford, and Old Milford, in Milford Haven in Pembrokeshire, Wales, United Kingdom
 South Milford railway station, formerly Milford railway station, on the Leeds to Selby line, United Kingdom
 Milford Old junction railway station, also known as York Junction, and Gascoigne Wood; on the Leeds to Selby line, United Kingdom
 Milford Junction railway station on the York and North Midland Railway, United Kingdom

Places
 Milford Station, Nova Scotia, a village in Canada